Alejandro Pastor López (born 17 July 1979) is a former Socialists' Party of Catalonia (PSC) politician. First elected to Badalona City Council in 2015, he became mayor in 2018. He resigned on 22 April 2020 after being arrested and eventually convicted of drink driving and assaulting the police.

Early life and career
Pastor has degrees in Labour Relations and Labour Sciences. He was a member of a students' organisation and also active in the youth wing of the PSC. He first took part in an election to the city council in 1995, but otherwise spent his early adulthood as a civil servant in a department related to employment.

In 2015, Pastor was elected to the city council, but amidst a poor result for his party. The left-wing, anti-independence PSC had to choose between backing the left-wing and pro-independence candidate Dolors Sabater or the right-wing, anti-independence incumbent Xavier García Albiol as mayor.

In 2018, Pastor tabled a vote of no confidence in Sabater. The motion carried on 20 June with support of the three PSC councillors, the ten from the People's Party and the one from Citizens. In the 2019 elections, he retained his office when Sabater withdrew her candidacy and the separatist parties voted for Pastor.

Resignation and conviction
On 21 April 2020, Pastor was stopped by the Mossos d'Esquadra for driving erratically. Police reports said that he repeatedly brought up his position as an excuse to go free, refused to take a breathalyser test and began assaulting officers, including biting. He was additionally arrested for breaking the COVID-19 lockdown. Suspended by his party, he resigned his office the following day. Days before his offences, Pastor said of people who broke lockdown "there are people who think they're smarter than the rest and that they don't have to abide by the rules. They don't put their health at risk, but ours". Sources close to Pastor said that his job and his personal life had caused him physical and psychological harm.

In February 2021, Pastor went to court in Barcelona. He was convicted and fined €800 and banned from driving for 16 months. He was sentenced to eight months in prison, suspended due to his lack of previous convictions and his agreement to pay damages.

References

1979 births
Living people
People from Badalona
Socialists' Party of Catalonia politicians
Mayors of Badalona
Municipal councillors in the province of Barcelona
Spanish politicians convicted of crimes
People convicted of assault